The women's shot put event at the 2022 African Championships in Athletics was held on 8 June in Port Louis, Mauritius.

Results

References

2022 African Championships in Athletics
Shot put at the African Championships in Athletics